The following lists events that happened in 1992 in Libya.

Incumbents
President: Muammar al-Gaddafi
 Prime Minister: Abuzed Omar Dorda

Births
 12 July - Abdulaziz Belraysh.

 
Years of the 20th century in Libya
Libya
Libya
1990s in Libya